Juraj Gráčik (born 14 August 1986) is a Slovak former professional ice hockey player.

Career
Gráčik was selected by the Atlanta Thrashers in the 5th round (142nd overall) of the 2004 NHL Entry Draft. Following his draft selection, he spent two seasons in the Western Hockey League for the Tri-City Americans before returning to Slovakia in 2006 to sign for HC Slovan Bratislava.

In 2011, Gráčik moved to the United Kingdom and signed for the Milton Keynes Lightning in the EPIHL.

Career statistics

Regular season and playoffs

International

References

External links

Living people
1986 births
Atlanta Thrashers draft picks
HC Slovan Bratislava players
HK Nitra players
Milton Keynes Lightning players
Slovak ice hockey right wingers
Sportspeople from Topoľčany
Tri-City Americans players
Slovak expatriate ice hockey players in the United States
Expatriate ice hockey players in England
Slovak expatriate sportspeople in England